New drug development may refer to both:

Drug discovery
Drug development